In enzymology, an amine N-methyltransferase is an enzyme that is ubiquitously present in non-neural tissues and that catalyzes the N-methylation of tryptamine and structurally related compounds.

The chemical reaction taking place is:
 S-adenosyl-L-methionine + an amine  S-adenosyl-L-homocysteine + a methylated amine

Thus, the two substrates of this enzyme are S-adenosyl methionine and amine, whereas its two products are S-adenosylhomocysteine and methylated amine. In the case of tryptamine and serotonin these then become the dimethylated indolethylamines N,N-dimethyltryptamine (DMT) and bufotenine respectively.

This enzyme belongs to the family of transferases, specifically those transferring one-carbon group methyltransferases. The systematic name of this enzyme class is S-adenosyl-L-methionine:amine N-methyltransferase. Other names in common use include nicotine N-methyltransferase, tryptamine N-methyltransferase, indolethylamine N-methyltransferase, and arylamine N-methyltransferase. This enzyme participates in tryptophan metabolism.

A wide range of primary, secondary and tertiary amines can act as acceptors, including tryptamine, aniline, nicotine and a variety of drugs and other xenobiotics.

Structural studies

As of late 2007, only one structure has been solved for this class of enzymes, with the PDB accession code .

See also
 Tryptamine

References

External links
 
 
 

EC 2.1.1
Enzymes of known structure